Leila Muhammad Abdulfatah Muhammad Abdelmoez (born 30 September 1996) is an Egyptian synchronised swimmer. She competed in the team event at the 2016 Summer Olympics.

References

External links
 

1996 births
Living people
Egyptian synchronized swimmers
Olympic synchronized swimmers of Egypt
Synchronized swimmers at the 2016 Summer Olympics